Ayside is a hamlet on the A590 road, in the South Lakeland district, in the county of Cumbria, England.


References 
 Philip's Street Atlas Cumbria (page 154)

External links

Hamlets in Cumbria
Staveley-in-Cartmel